The San Marino men's national under-16 basketball team is a national basketball team of San Marino, administered by the San Marino Basketball Federation. It represents the country in international men's under-16 basketball competitions.

The team won two medals at the FIBA U16 European Championship Division C.

FIBA U16 European Championship participations

See also
San Marino men's national basketball team
San Marino men's national under-18 basketball team

References

External links
Archived records of San Marino team participations

Basketball in San Marino
Basketball
Men's national under-16 basketball teams